The Yeon Building is a historic , 15-story office building completed in 1911 in downtown Portland, Oregon. Almost completely clad in glazed terra-cotta, and culminating in a colonnade on the top floors, the Yeon Building once was illuminated at night by light sockets built into the cornices, but later removed. The building's namesake is Jean Baptiste Yeon (1865–1928), a self-made timber tycoon who financed the construction. At the time of completion, the Yeon Building was the tallest building in Oregon and it remained so for nearly two years.

In 1994, the Yeon Building was added to the National Register of Historic Places. The building was repossessed by First Independent Bank in 2010 from Fountain Village Development and re-sold in March 2011 for $8.9 million. The  was purchased at that time by RGOF Yeon Building LLC.

See also
Architecture of Portland, Oregon
National Register of Historic Places listings in Southwest Portland, Oregon

References

External links
 

Skyscraper office buildings in Portland, Oregon
National Register of Historic Places in Portland, Oregon
Reid & Reid buildings
Office buildings completed in 1911
Chicago school architecture in Oregon
1911 establishments in Oregon
Southwest Portland, Oregon
Portland Historic Landmarks
Modernist architecture in Oregon